Jeron Johnson (born June 12, 1988) is a former American football strong safety. He was signed by the Seattle Seahawks as an undrafted free agent in 2011. He played college football at Boise State.

Professional career

Seattle Seahawks
Johnson was signed by the Seattle Seahawks as an undrafted free agent following the end of the 2011 NFL lockout. He made the 53-man active roster as a reserve safety behind Kam Chancellor.

The Seahawks placed him on injured reserve on December 11, 2013, causing him to miss the last three games of the regular season and the team's playoff run and win in Super Bowl XLVIII.

On March 7, 2014, Johnson re-signed with the Seahawks on a one-year contract.

Washington Redskins
On March 16, 2015, Johnson signed a two-year, $4 million contract with the Washington Redskins. By the end of training camp, he was beat out of the starting strong safety position by Duke Ihenacho.
In the Week 6 game against the New York Jets, he blocked a punt in the endzone, which was recovered by wide receiver Rashad Ross for a touchdown.

The Redskins released Johnson on March 7, 2016.

Kansas City Chiefs
On August 5, 2016, Johnson was signed by the Kansas City Chiefs. On September 2, 2016, Johnson was released by the Chiefs.

Second stint with the Seattle Seahawks
On December 6, 2016, Johnson re-signed with the Seahawks after Earl Thomas was placed on injured reserve.

Jacksonville Jaguars
On August 6, 2017, Johnson signed with the Jacksonville Jaguars. He was placed on injured reserve on September 1, 2017. He was released by the team on September 8, 2017.

Dallas Cowboys
On August 21, 2018, Johnson signed with the Dallas Cowboys. He was released on September 1, 2018.

Career statistics

References

External links
 Seattle Seahawks bio
 Washington Redskins bio

1988 births
Living people
American football safeties
Boise State Broncos football players
Seattle Seahawks players
Sportspeople from Compton, California
Washington Redskins players
Kansas City Chiefs players
Jacksonville Jaguars players
Dallas Cowboys players
High school football coaches in Washington (state)
Boise State Broncos football coaches
Players of American football from Compton, California